Georg Beer may refer to:

 Georg Joseph Beer (1763–1821), Austrian ophthalmologist
 Georg Beer, a pseudonym of Israel Beer (1912–1966), Austrian-Israeli author and spy